Dr. Chen Jirui (also known as Chen Jirui, 1930–2004) was a Chinese research scientist, medical doctor and teacher. He played a key role in introducing Traditional Chinese medicine to English-language speaking medical professionals. His book Acupuncture Case Histories from China was essential reading for the California State Acupuncture Board.

Professional life 
Chen graduated from Peking Union Medical College in 1957. In the early 1980s he was one of the founders of the Journal of Traditional Chinese Medicine, the first English language periodical on TCM published in China. He was also a member of the China Academy of Traditional Chinese Medicine.

He was co-editor (with Nissi Wang) of Acupuncture Case Histories from China (Eastland Press, 1988), a book which marked "the first original collection of acupuncture case histories in English. Included are over one hundred case histories contributed by prominent practitioners of acupuncture in China."

In 1990, he emigrated to the United States, where he held several posts, again serving as an intermediary between Western medicine and Traditional Chinese Medicine (TCM) and acupuncture. He was also director of research at the East West Medical Research Institute in Los Angeles, co-editor-in-chief of the International Journal of Clinical Acupuncture, research scientist at Cedars-Sinai Medical Center, an instructor at SAMRA University and Emperor's College, and director of research at Tongyuan International.

Publications 
 (co-ed. with Nissi Wang) Acupuncture Case Histories from China (Eastland Press, 1988) 
 (co-ed. with Nissi Wang, tr. François Beyens) Acupuncture: observations cliniques en Chine (Vigot, 1999) 
 (co-ed. with Nissi Wang, tr. Josef Fallbacher) Akupunktur aus China in 101 Fallbeschreibungen : Diagnose und Therapie gemäss den Grundlagen der Traditionellen Chinesischen Medizin (Wilhelm Maudrich, 2000) 
 (co-ed. with Nissi Wang) Casos Clinicos de Acupuntura da China

References

External links 
 Chen Jirui on Worldcat

1930 births
Traditional Chinese medicine
Acupuncture
Peking Union Medical College alumni
2004 deaths